"I Can Be" is the debut single by Danish singer Ida who won the fifth Danish series of The X Factor. It was released as a Digital download in Denmark on 31 March 2012. The song entered the Danish Singles Chart at number 1. The song is included on her debut studio album Seize the Day (2013).

Track listing

Chart performance

Weekly charts

Release history

References

2012 singles
Ida (singer) songs
Number-one singles in Denmark
2012 songs
Sony Music singles